Tarzan's Revenge is a 1938 American adventure film starring Glenn Morris in his only outing as Tarzan. Eleanor Holm, a popular swimming star, co-starred as Eleanor Reed. The film was produced by Sol Lesser, written by Robert Lee Johnson and Jay Vann (based on the character created by Edgar Rice Burroughs) and directed by D. Ross Lederman. Sol Lesser cast two Olympic athletes in Tarzan's Revenge: 1936 decathlon champion Glenn Morris as Tarzan and aquatic medal-winner Eleanor Holm as "Eleanor".

Plot
Eleanor Reed (Eleanor Holm) accompanies her parents, Roger and Penny (George Barbier and Hedda Hopper), and Nevin Potter (George Meeker), her fiance, on an expedition to Africa to capture wild animals to sell to a zoo. Ben Alleu Bey (C. Henry Gordon) spots Eleanor and wishes her to become the one hundredth wife in his harem. When she refuses, he follows their safari.

Both groups are followed closely by Tarzan, who releases the animals and woos Eleanor away from both Nevin and Bey.  When Nevin discovers that Eleanor plans to remain behind with Tarzan, he attempts to kill him, but only grazes his shoulder with a round fired at close range. Tarzan attacks Nevin, but releases him at Eleanor's behest. As the Reeds' ship sails down the river, Tarzan and Eleanor go for a swim.

Cast
 Glenn Morris as Tarzan
 Eleanor Holm as Eleanor Reed
 George Meeker as Nevin Potter, Eleanor's fiance
 Hedda Hopper as Penny Reed, Eleanor's mother
 George Barbier as Roger Reed, Eleanor's father
 C. Henry Gordon as Ben Alleu Bey
 Joe Sawyer as Olaf Punch (as Joseph Sawyer) 
 Corbet Morris as Jigger - Nevin's Servant 
 John Lester Johnson as Koki - Chief Bearer 
 Frederick Clarke as Ben Alleu's Servant

Critical response
Tarzan's Revenge has received negative critical responses, with the film described as "[p]reposterous from beginning to end" and "absurd." Lead actor Morris was described as "an irredeemably awful actor" whose jungle yell is "so ludicrous as to be laughable."

Production notes
Producer Sol Lesser originally considered casting baseball great Lou Gehrig as Tarzan, but was unimpressed with Gehrig's legs, calling them "more functional than decorative."

Lesser refused to call the lead female character Jane—according to him, Eleanor Holm was so famous for her swimming exploits that audiences would not accept her portraying anyone other than someone named Eleanor.

References
Notes

Bibliography
Essoe, Gabe. Tarzan of The Movies, 1968, published by The Citadel Press.

External links

 
 
 
 

1938 films
1930s fantasy adventure films
1930s English-language films
20th Century Fox films
American black-and-white films
Films directed by D. Ross Lederman
Tarzan films
Films produced by Sol Lesser
American fantasy adventure films
1930s American films

pt:A Vingança de Tarzan